Bailin station, is a station of Line 4 of Wuhan Metro. It entered revenue service on September 25, 2019. It is located in Caidian District and it is the western terminus of Line 4.

Station layout

Gallery

Naming in English
In writing, the Chinese name of this station is the same with "Berlin", the capital city of Germany. The English name came from the romanization of such Chinese name was first written as "Bolin", same with the pronunciation of Berlin in Chinese, and thus it appeared in news reports jokingly as "a Wuhan Metro line that can take you to Germany".

Shortly after the opening of this station, the local government decided to change the English name to "Bailin", an alternative way to pronounce the Chinese name, because the place name "Bailin" in Caidian District actually comes from a Platycladus forest in the area.

References

Wuhan Metro stations
Line 4, Wuhan Metro
Railway stations in China opened in 2019